Ku Yeon-woo (born 15 March 2003) is a South Korean tennis player.

She has a career-high singles ranking of 421 by the Women's Tennis Association (WTA), achieved on 3 October 2022, and a best WTA doubles ranking of 453, reached on 24 October 2022.

Ku made her WTA Tour main-draw debut at the 2022 Korea Open, after receiving a wildcard for the doubles tournament.

References

External links
 
 

2003 births
Living people
South Korean female tennis players
21st-century South Korean women